Aplatissa is a genus of moths of the family Hepialidae. There are two described species, both endemic to Brazil.

Species
Aplatissa michaelis
Aplatissa strangoides

External links
Hepialidae genera

Hepialidae
Endemic fauna of Brazil
Moths of South America
Exoporia genera
Taxa named by Pierre Viette